America Chuck Middleton (born December 10, 1959) is an American politician. He is a member of the Mississippi House of Representatives from the 85th District, being first elected in 1995. He is a member of the Democratic party.

References

1959 births
Living people
Democratic Party members of the Mississippi House of Representatives
21st-century American politicians